Justice is the twelfth studio album by American country pop group Exile. It was released on June 25, 1991 via Arista Records. The includes the singles "Even Now", "Nothing at All" and "Somebody's Telling Her Lies".

Track listing

Chart performance

References

1991 albums
Exile (American band) albums
Arista Records albums